Meryem Akda, also spelled Akdağ (born Mirriam Jepchirchir Maiyo on August 5, 1992) is a Turkish female middle-distance and long-distance runner of Kenyan origin competing in the 3000 m steeplechase and 5000 m events. She is a member of Enkaspor in Istanbul.

She competed for Kenya until May 21, 2015. On March 13, 2016, she became officially eligible to represent Turkey at international competitions.

Akda earned a quota spot for the women's 5000 m and another one for Women's 3000 m steeplechase event in the 2016 Summer Olympics.

References

External links

1992 births
Kenyan female middle-distance runners
Kenyan female steeplechase runners
Kenyan female long-distance runners
Naturalized citizens of Turkey
Kenyan emigrants to Turkey
Turkish female middle-distance runners
Turkish female steeplechase runners
Turkish female long-distance runners
Living people
Enkaspor athletes
Athletes (track and field) at the 2016 Summer Olympics
Olympic athletes of Turkey
Athletes (track and field) at the 2018 Mediterranean Games
Mediterranean Games competitors for Turkey